Natasha Arthy (born 23 May 1969 in Gentofte, Denmark) is a Danish screenwriter, film director and producer, best known for her 2003 Dogme film Se til venstre, der er en Svensker (USA Title: Old, New, Borrowed and Blue), which received the Grand Jury Prize at the Los Angeles Film Festival.

Filmography

Director
Fightgirl Ayse (2007)
Se til venstre, der er en Svensker (2003) ...  Dogme # 32 ... a.k.a. Old, New, Borrowed and Blue (USA)
Mirakel (2000) ... a.k.a. Miracle (International: English title)
Barbie (1997)
Drengen de kaldte Kylling (1997) TV mini-series
Fanny Farveløs (1997) ... a.k.a. Penny Plain
Y's fantom farmor (1996) TV mini-series
Forunderlige Frede (1995) TV mini-series
Container Conrad (1994) TV mini-series
Fortælle frikadelle (1993) TV mini-series

Producer
Anton — min hemmelige ven II (2002) TV series (producer) (episodes 1.1-1.4, 1.6, 1.8)
Drengen de kaldte Kylling (1997) TV mini-series (producer)
Y's fantom farmor (1996) TV mini-series (producer)
Forunderlige Frede (1995) TV mini-series (producer)

Writer
Fightgirl Ayse (2007)
Y's fantom farmor (1996) TV mini-series

References

External links
 
 

Danish women film directors
Danish film producers
1969 births
Living people
Danish film directors